The 1980 Dutch TT was the fifth round of the 1980 Grand Prix motorcycle racing season. It took place on the weekend of 27–28 June 1980 at the TT Circuit Assen located in Assen, Netherlands.

Classification

500 cc

References

Dutch TT
Dutch
Tourist Trophy